Catopta perunovi is a moth in the family Cossidae. It was described by Yakovlev in 2007. It is found in the Altai mountains, the Sayan mountains, north-western Mongolia and central Yakutia.

The length of the forewings is 16–18 mm. The forewings are grey with a white spot in the discal area. The hindwings have a 'coffee with milk' colour.

References

Natural History Museum Lepidoptera generic names catalog

Moths described in 2007
Catoptinae